The non-marine molluscs of Malta are a part of the molluscan fauna of Malta (wildlife of Malta).

A number of species of non-marine molluscs are found in the wild in Malta. There are 78 species of gastropods, 15 species of freshwater gastropods, 62 species of land gastropods) and 2 species of bivalves living in the wild.

There are 5 non-indigenous species of gastropods (2 freshwater and 2 land species). There are no non-indigenous species of bivalves in the wild in Malta.

Freshwater gastropods 
Freshwater gastropods in Malta include:

Hydrobiidae
 Hydrobia acuta (Draparnaud, 1805) - in brackish water
 Hydrobia ventrosa (Montagu, 1803) - in brackish water
 Paludinella littorina (Delle Chiaje, 1828) - in brackish water
 Pseudamnicola moussoni (Calcara, 1841)
 Heleobia stagnorum (Gmelin, 1791) - synonym: Littorinida stagnorum (Gmelin, 1791) - in brackish water
 Mercuria similis (Draparnaud, 1805)

Thiaridae
 Melanoides tuberculata (O. F. Müller, 1774) - probably locally extinct
Lymnaeidae
 Galba truncatula (O. F. Müller, 1774)
 Radix peregra (O. F. Müller, 1774) - probably locally extinct

Physidae
 Physella acuta Draparnaud, 1805 - non-indigenous

Planorbidae
 Planorbis moquini Requien, 1848
 Planorbis planorbis (Linnaeus, 1758) - probably locally extinct
 Gyraulus laevis (Alder, 1838)
 Helisoma duryi Wetherby, 1879 - non-indigenous
 Ancylus fluviatilis (O. F. Müller, 1774)

Land gastropods 
Land gastropods in Malta include:

Pomatiidae
 Pomatias elegans (O. F. Müller, 1774) - non-indigenous
 Tudorella sulcata (Draparnaud, 1805)

Truncatellidae
 Truncatella subcylindrica (Linnaeus, 1767) - partly marine, partly land snail

Ellobiidae
 Leucophytia bidentata (Montagu, 1808) - semi-marine
 Ovatella firminii (Payraudeau, 1826) - semi-marine
 Myosotella myosotis (Draparnaud, 1801) - semi-marine
 Carychium schlickumi Strauch, 1977

Lauriidae
 Lauria cylindracea (Da Costa, 1778)

Valloniidae
 Vallonia pulchella (O. F. Müller, 1774)

Vertiginidae
 Truncatellina callicratis (Scacchi, 1833)

Pleurodiscidae
 Pleurodiscus balmei (Potiez & Michaud, 1838)

Chondrinidae
 Granopupa granum (Draparnaud, 1801)
 Rupestrella philippii (Cantraine, 1840)

Enidae
 Mastus pupa (Linnaeus, 1758)

Clausiliidae
 Lampedusa imitatrix (O. Boettger, 1879) - Lampedusa imitatrix imitatrix (O. Boettger, 1879) - endemic; Lampedusa imitatrix melitensis (Gatto, 1892) - endemic
 Muticaria macrostoma (Cantraine, 1835) - Muticaria macrostoma macrostoma (Cantraine, 1835) - endemic; Muticaria macrostoma oscitans (Charpentier, 1852) - endemic; Muticaria macrostoma macrostoma × Muticaria macrostoma oscitans - endemic; Muticaria macrostoma macrostoma × Muticaria macrostoma scalaris
 hybrid Lampedusa imitatrix imitatrix × Muticaria macrostoma macrostoma
 Muticaria macrostoma (Gulia, 1861) - Muticaria macrostoma mamotica (Gulia, 1861) - endemic; Muticaria macrostoma scalaris (L. Pfeiffer, 1848) - endemic
 Papillifera papillaris (O. F. Müller, 1774)

Ferussaciidae
 Ferussacia folliculum (Gronovius, 1781)
 Cecilioides acicula (O. F. Müller, 1774)
 Cecilioides janii (De Betta & Martinati, 1855)
 Cecilioides petitiana (Benoit, 1862)
 Hohenwartiana hohenwarti (Rossmässler, 1839)

Subulinidae
 Rumina decollata (Linnaeus, 1758)

Testacellidae
 Testacella riedeli Guisti, Manganelli & Schembri, 1995

Discidae
 Discus rotundatus (O. F. Müller, 1774) - non-indigenous

Succineidae
 Oxyloma elegans (Risso, 1826)

Pristilomatidae
 Vitrea contracta (Westerlund, 1871)
 Vitrea subrimata (Reinhardt, 1871)

Oxychilidae
 Mediterranea hydatina (Rossmässler, 1838)
 Oxychilus draparnaudi (Beck, 1837)

Milacidae
 Milax nigricans (Schultz, 1836)
 Tandonia sowerbyi (Férussac, 1823)

Limacidae
 Limacus flavus Linnaeus, 1758
 Lehmannia melitensis (Lessona & Pollonera, 1882)
 Ambigolimax valentianus (Férussac, 1821) – introduced 

Agriolimacidae
 Deroceras panormitanum (Lessona & Pollonera, 1882)
 Deroceras golcheri Altena, 1962

Sphincterochilidae
 Sphincterochila candidissima (Draparnaud, 1801)

Hygromiidae
 Cernuella caruanae (Kobelt, 1888) - endemic to Malta and Sicily
 Cernuella cisalpina (Rossmässler, 1837)
 Cernuella virgata (Da Costa, 1778)
 Cochlicella acuta (O. F. Müller, 1774)
 Cochlicella conoidea (Draparnaud, 1801)
 Schileykiella parlatoris (Bivona, 1839)
 Trochoidea calcarata (Benoit, 1860) - endemic
 Trochoidea cucullus (Martens, 1873) - endemic
 Trochoidea despotti (Soós, 1933) - endemic
 Trochoidea ogygiaca (Westerlund, 1889) - endemic
 Trochoidea schembrii (Pfeiffer, 1848) - endemic
 Trochoidea spratti (Pfeiffer, 1846) - endemic
 Xerocrassa gharlapsi (Beckmann, 1987) - endemic
 Xerocrassa meda (Porro, 1840)
 Xerotricha apicina (Lamarck, 1822)
 Xerotricha conspurcata (Draparnaud, 1801)

Helicidae
 Cantareus aperta (Born, 1778)
 Cornu aspersum (O. F. Müller, 1774)
 Eobania vermiculata (O. F. Müller, 1774)
 Murella globularis (Philippi, 1836)
 Murella melitensis (Férussac, 1821) - endemic
 Theba pisana (O. F. Müller, 1774)

Trissexodontidae
 Caracollina lenticula (Michaud, 1831)

Freshwater bivalves
Freshwater bivalves in Malta include:

Sphaeriidae
 Pisidium casertanum (Poli, 1791)
 Pisidium personatum (Malm, 1855)

See also
Lists of molluscs of surrounding oversea countries:
 List of non-marine molluscs of Italy, Wildlife of Italy
 List of non-marine molluscs of Tunisia, Wildlife of Tunisia
 List of non-marine molluscs of Libya, Wildlife of Libya

The following species have been found only as fossils on Malta:

Fossil  freshwater gastropods
 Gyraulus crista (Linnaeus, 1758)
 Bulinus truncatus (Audouin, 1827)

Fossil terrestrial gastropods
 Vertigo antivertigo (Draparnaud, 1801)
 Orculella templorum (Benoit, 1862)
 Siciliaria septemplicata (Philipii, 1836)
 Cernuella durieui (Pfeiffer, 1848)
 Trochoidea caroni (Deshayes, 1830) - fossil endemic to Malta and Sicily

References

 External links 
 Beckmann K. H. (1987). "Land - und Süβwassermollusken der Maltesischen Inseln". Heldia 1,suppl. 1: 1-38.
 Beckmann K. H. (1992). "Catalogue and bibliography of the land and freshwater molluscs of the Maltese Islands, the Pelagi Islands and the isle of Pantelleria". Heldia 2suppl. 2: 1-60.
 Beckmann K. H. & Gittenberger E. (1987). "The Clausiliidae (Gastropoda) of the Maltese Islands, some additional data". Journal of Conchology 32: 335-338.
 Holyoak D. T. (1986). "Biological species-limits and systematics of Clausiliidae (Gastropoda) of the Maltese Islands". Journal of Conchology 32: 211-220.
 Mandahl-Barth G. (1988). "The shell-bearing land-snails of Malta". Mdina, Malta, Friends of the National Museum of Natural History, iv + 65 pp.
 Soós L. (1933). "A systematic and zoogeographical contribution to the mollusc fauna of the Maltese Islands and Lampedusa". Archiv für Naturgeschichte 2: 305-353.
 Thake M. A. & Schembri P. J. (1989). "Mollusca". In: Schembri P. J. & Sultana J. (eds.) Red data book for the Maltese Islands''. pp. 79-89. Valletta, Malta, Department of Information.

Molluscs, Non
Molluscs
Malta
Malta
Malta